Rossville is a city in Walker County, Georgia, United States. The population was 3,980 at the 2020 census. It is part of the Chattanooga, TN–GA Metropolitan Statistical Area.

History
A post office has been in operation at Rossville since 1817. The city was named after Cherokee Indian Chief John Ross, who resided there until being forced to relocate with his people to Oklahoma on the Trail of Tears. The city incorporated in 1905.

The John Ross House, a log cabin,  was declared a National Historic Landmark in 1973.

Geography

Rossville is a suburb of Chattanooga, Tennessee, and the cities are separated by the Tennessee/Georgia state line. The city lies in a broad valley between Missionary Ridge to the east and Lookout Mountain to the west.  Fort Oglethorpe and the Chickamauga and Chattanooga National Military Park lie across Missionary Ridge to the southeast.  U.S. Route 27 connects Rossville to Chattanooga and Fort Oglethorpe.

Demographics

2020 census

As of the 2020 United States census, there were 3,980 people, 1,457 households, and 1,051 families residing in the city.

2010 census
As of the census of 2010, there were 4,105 people, 1,507 households, and 955 families residing in the city. The racial makeup of the city was 93.51% White, 3.90% African American, 0.57% Native American, 0.34% Asian, 0.48% from other races, and 1.20% from two or more races. Hispanic or Latino of any race were 1.28% of the population.

There were 1,507 households, out of which 29.6% had children under the age of 18 living with them, 39.9% were married couples living together, 19.0% had a female householder with no husband present, and 36.6% were non-families. 32.6% of all households were made up of individuals, and 16.4% had someone living alone who was 65 years of age or older.  The average household size was 2.26 and the average family size was 2.85.

In the city, the population was spread out, with 24.6% under the age of 18, 8.9% from 18 to 24, 26.7% from 25 to 44, 19.4% from 45 to 64, and 20.4% who were 65 years of age or older.  The median age was 37 years. For every 100 females, there were 80.1 males.  For every 100 females age 18 and over, there were 74.5 males.

The median income for a household in the city was $23,612, and the median income for a family was $29,423. Males had a median income of $26,346 versus $21,875 for females. The per capita income for the city was $14,175.  About 16.6% of families and 20.3% of the population were below the poverty line, including 30.0% of those under age 18 and 14.7% of those age 65 or over.

Notable people
 Lauren Alaina - Country singer.
 Kane Brown - Country singer.
 Ashley Harkleroad - Professional tennis player.
 Martin Scott - Politician. Member of Georgia House of Representatives.

See also
 Ross's Landing

References

External links

Official site

Cities in Georgia (U.S. state)
Cities in Walker County, Georgia
Cities in the Chattanooga metropolitan area
1817 establishments in the United States